The Golden Striker (subtitled Music for Brass & Piano by John Lewis Conducted & Played by the Composer) is an album in the third stream music genre composed by John Lewis recorded for the Atlantic label in 1960.

Reception

The Allmusic review by Scott Yanow stated: "One of the less interesting John Lewis 'third-stream' projects" and "Although the pianist takes a few solos, the music is mostly written out and frankly rather dull".

Track listing
All compositions by John Lewis
 "Fanfare I" – 0:38
 "Piazza Navona" – 6:28
 "Odds Against Tomorrow" – 7:45
 "Fanfare II" – 0:33
 "Pulcinella" – 4:15
 "Fanfare II" – 0:23
 "The Golden Striker" – 4:55
 "Piazza di Spagna" – 4:33
 "Fanfare I" – 0:38
 "La Cantatrice" – 5:03

Personnel 
John Lewis – piano, conductor
Melvyn Broiles, Bernie Glow, Alan Kiger, Joe Wilder – trumpet
David Baker, Dick Hixson – trombone
Ray Alonge, John Barrows, Al Richman, Gunther Schuller – French horn
Jay McAllister (tracks 1, 3–7, 9 & 10), Harvey Phillips (tracks 2 & 8)   – tuba 
George Duvivier – bass 
Connie Kay – drums

References 

1960 albums
John Lewis (pianist) albums
Albums produced by Nesuhi Ertegun
Atlantic Records albums